The Association for Justice and Equality was a political party in Iceland.

History
The party was formed by Stefán Valgeirsson as a breakaway from the Progressive Party. It contested the 1987 parliamentary elections in the Northeastern Region. Although it received only 1,893 votes (1.2%), it won a single seat in the Althing, taken by Valgeirsson.

References

Defunct political parties in Iceland
Political parties with year of establishment missing
Political parties with year of disestablishment missing